Metapolis is a complex of four residential skyscrapers in Hwaseong, South Korea  With the ground broken in July 2006 by POSCO E&C and the buildings topped-out in August 2009, the structures were completed in July 2010.  The two tallest towers (#101 and #104) have heights of 249m and 247m respectively and 66 storeys each, making them the third-tallest residential skyscrapers in South Korea and the centerpiece of the New Dongtan City.  The two shorter skyscrapers are 60 (#102) and 55 (#103) floors in height, measuring 224m and 203m respectively.

External links 
CTBUH Official Database
Official website of Metapolis
Official construction information

References

Residential skyscrapers in South Korea
Residential buildings completed in 2010
Buildings and structures in Hwaseong, Gyeonggi